

This is a list of famous pairs in mythology or legend or history:

Lovers
 Acis and Galatea (Greek)
 Aeneas and Dido (Roman)
 Alcestis and Admetus (Greek)
 Alcyone and Ceyx (Greek)
 Apollo and Daphne (Greek)
 Apollo and Hyacinth (Greek)
 Ares/Mars and Aphrodite/Venus (Greek) - (Roman)
 Arjuna and Draupadi (Hindu)
 Atalanta and Hippomenes/Melanion (Greek)
 Bheema and Draupadi (Hindu)
 Cadmus and Harmonia (Greek)
 Clytie and Helios (Greek)
 Cronus and Rhea (Greek)
 Chang'e and Hou Yi (Chinese)
 Cú Chulainn and Aífe (Irish)
 Cybele and Attis (Greek)
 Daphnis and Chloë (Roman)
 Deucalion and Pyrrha (Greek)
 Diarmuid and Gráinne (Irish)
 Dionysus/Bacchus and Ampelos (Greek) (Roman)
 Dionysus/Bacchus and Ariadne (Greek) (Roman)
 Eros and Psyche (Greek)
 Gaia and Uranus (Greek)
 Gilgamesh and Enkidu (Sumerian)
 Hagbard and Signy (Norse)
 Hector and Andromache (Greek)
 Helios and Clymene (Greek)
 Hephaestus/Vulcan and Aphrodite/Venus (Greek) - (Roman)
 Heracles and Dejanira (Greek)
 Heracles and Hebe (Greek)
 Heracles and Iole (Greek)
 Heracles and Omphale (Greek)
 Hero and Leander (Greek)
 Hippolytus and Aricia (Greek)
 Isis and Osiris (Egyptian)
 Ixchel and Itzamna (Mayan)
 Izanami-no-Mikoto and Izanagi (Japanese)
 Kaliyan and Kalicchi (Southern Hindu)
 Krishna and Radha (Hindu)
 Lancelot and Guinevere (Arthurian)
 Layla and Majnun (Middle Eastern)
 Leda and the swan (Greek)
 Medea and Jason (Greek)
 Minos and Pasiphaë (Greek)
 Nakul and Draupadi (Hindu)
 Narcissus and Echo (Greek)
 Nereus and Doris (Greek)
 Nyx and Erebus (Greek)
 Oedipus and Jocasta (Greek)
 Orpheus and Eurydice (Greek)
 Paris and Helen (Greek)
 Persephone and Hades (Greek)
 Perseus and Andromeda (Greek)
 Philemon and Baucis (Greek)
 Phyllis and Demophon (Greek)
 Popocatépetl and Iztaccíhuatl (Aztec), two volcanoes
 Poseidon and Amphitrite (Greek)
 Proserpina and Pluto (Roman)
 Pyramus and Thisbe (Greek)
 Pyrrhus and Andromache (Greek)
 Rama and Sita (Hindu)
 Sahadeva and Draupadi (Hindu)
 Sampooranathevan and Paradevathai (Southern Hindu)
 Scylla and Glaucus (Greek)
 Selene and Endymion (Greek)
 Shiva and Parvati (Sati) (Hindu)
 Sigurd and Brunhild (Norse)
 Siyavash and Sudabeh (Persian)
 The Cowherd and the Weaver Girl (Chinese), representing Altair and Vega and commemorated by the annual Qixi Festival
 Theseus and Ariadne (Greek)
 Theseus and Hippolyta (Greek)
 Thetis and Peleus
 Tristan and Iseult (Arthurian)
 Troilus and Cressida (Greek)
 Ulysses and Circe (Greek)
 Ulysses and Penelope (Greek)
 Venus and Adonis (Greek - Roman)
 Vishnu and Lakshmi (Hindu)
 Yudhishthira and Draupadi (Hindu)
 Yusuf and Zulaikha (Islamic)
 Zal and Rudabeh (Persian)
 Zeus and Ganymede (Greek)
 Zeus and many mortal women and nymphs (see Zeus)
 Abhimanyu and Uttara (Hindi)
 Bheema and Hidimbi (Hindu)

Twins
See: Twins in mythology
 Aegyptus and Danaus (Greek)
 Aeolus and Boeotus (Greek)
 Agenor and Belus (Greek)
 Amphion and Zethus (Greek)
 Apollo and Artemis/Diana (Greek) (Roman)
 Arsu and Azizos (Palmyran)
 Ascalaphus and Ialmenus (Greek)
 Atreus and Thyestes (Greek)
 Ašvieniai divine twins (Lithuanian)
 Cassandra and Helenus (Greek)
 Castor and Pollux (Greek)
 Dylan ail Don and Lleu Llaw Gyffes (Welsh)
 Erechtheus and Butes (Greek)
 Eurysthenes and Procles (Greek)
 Freyr and Freyja (Norse)
 Glooscap and Malsumis (American Indian)
 Helen and Clytemnestra (Greek)
 Heracles and Iphicles (Greek)
 Iasus and Pelasgus (Greek)
 Hunahpu and Xbalanque (Maya)
 Hypnos/Somnus and Thanatos/Mors, Letum (Greek) - (Roman)
 Lakshmana and Shatrughna (Hindu)
 Luv and Kush (Hindu)
 Lycastus and Parrhasius (Greek)
 Manawydan and Brân (Welsh)
 Nakula and Sahadeva (Hindu)
 Nut and Geb (Egyptian)
 Otos and Ephialtes (Greek)
 Pelias and Neleus (Greek)
 Phobos and Deimos (Greek)
 Phrixus and Helle (Greek)
 Ploutos and Philomenos (Greek)
 Procles and Eurysthenes (Greek)
 Proetus and Acrisius (Greek)
 Romulus and Remus (Roman)
 Set and Nephthys (Egyptian)
 Sigmund/Siegmund and Signy/Sieglinde (Norse)
 Thessalus and Alcimenes (Greek)
 Xōchipilli and Xōchiquetzal (Aztec)
 Xolotl and Quetzalcoatl (Aztec)
 Yama and Yami (Hindu)
 (Draupadi) and (Drishtadyumna) (Hindu)
 Nara and Narayana (Hindu)

Other siblings
 Agamemnon and Menelaus (Greek)
 Balin and Balan (Arthurian)
 Baldr and Hodr (Norse)
 Eteocles and Polynices (Greek)
 Hänsel and Gretel (German)
 Hengist and Horsa (Saxon)
 Podalirius and Machaon (Greek)
 Prometheus and Epimetheus (Greek)
 Rama and Lakshmana (Hindu)
 Krishna, Balram and Subhadra (Hindu)

Friends
 Arjuna and Krishna (Hindu)
 Damon and Pythias (Greek)
 King Arthur and Lancelot (Arthurian)
 Orestes and Pylades (Greek)

Rivals
 Athena and Poseidon (Greek)
 Eros and Anteros (Greek)
 Abe no Seimei and Ashiya Dōman (Japanese)

Parent and Child(ren) duo
 Daedalus and Icarus (Greek)
 Oedipus and Antigone (Greek)
 Scylla and Charybdis (Greek)
 Subhadra and Abhimanyu (Hindu)
 Shiva and Ganesha (Hindu)
 Ganga and Bhishma (Hindu)
 Janaka and Sita (Hindu)
 Hidimbi and Ghatotkach (Hindu)
 Yashoda and Krishna (Hindu)
 Radha and Karna (Hindu)
 Sumitra and Lakshmana (Hindu)
 Uttara and Parikshit (Hindu)
 Sashirekha and Satyapriya (Hindu)
 Madri and Sahdev (Hindu)
 Kunti and Arjun (Hindu)
 Arjuna and Abhimanyu (Hindu)

See also
 lists of pairs

Pairs
Pairs
Lists of pairs